Common mallow is a common name used for a number of different species of Malva:
Malva sylvestris is the common mallow in Europe and North Africa
Malva neglecta is the common mallow in the United States
Malva preissiana is a "common mallow" in Australia and New Zealand